The 28th Scripps National Spelling Bee was held in Washington, District of Columbia on May 19, 1955, with the final rounds at the Department of Commerce auditorium, and was sponsored by the E.W. Scripps Company.

The winner was 13-year-old Sandra Sloss of Granite City, Illinois, correctly spelling the word crustaceology. Jean Copeland of Prescott, Arizona placed second. Naomi Klein, 12, of Brooklyn, New York, placed third after missing "quincunx". Last year's runnerup, William Kelley of Kennett, Missouri, placed fourth.

There were 62 contestants in the 1955 bee, 37 girls and 25 boys, ages 11–14. Three contestants were black, noted to be a new record at the time.

The first place prize was $500, the last year before the grand prize was doubled to $1000. Second place received $300, and third $100. The next 20 received $50 each, and the remaining 39 received $40.

References

External links
 Spelling Trouble - Pathe News, 2 minute newsreel footage of 1955 Bee

Scripps National Spelling Bee competitions
1955 in Washington, D.C.
1955 awards
1955 in education
May 1955 events in the United States